The 1938 All-Ireland Minor Hurling Championship was the 11th staging of the All-Ireland Minor Hurling Championship since its establishment by the Gaelic Athletic Association in 1928.

Cork entered the championship as the defending champions.

On 4 September 1938, Cork won the championship following a 7-2 to 5-4 defeat of Dublin in the All-Ireland final. This was their third All-Ireland title in the minor grade.

Results

Leinster Minor Hurling Championship

First round

Quarter-finals

Semi-finals

Final

Munster Minor Hurling Championship

Quarter-finals

Semi-final

Final

All-Ireland Minor Hurling Championship

Semi-final

Final

References

Minor
All-Ireland Minor Hurling Championship